MusicWorks, also MusicWorks Personal, is a music notation sequencing program for Windows 10 and earlier that uses MIDI protocol technology. An earlier release version ran on Windows 9x. It is being developed by Brisbane, Australia based tierramedia (which means "Middle Earth") formally called Middle Earth Software Systems. The rise in the popularity of Middle Earth meant the name had to change (sadly!). Its native file format is .MWW, but it can also import and export .mid. It has a font-based interface, and formatting up to the look of professional notation. Early versions of Music Works featured commonwealth music terms, and an easily crackable bug: the copy protection for the trial version could be circumnavigated by simply reinstalling the program. This was only fixed in the final, polished version, which was Music Works 3.5 Personal. With that, Middle Earth Software changed to tierramedia.com.

MWW
MWW is the non-documented, proprietary binary file format developed by Middle Earth Software that stored MIDI and additional information. The .mww files are typically about six to eight times larger than .mid files. MusicWorks has an autosave feature that created a "~MW" file, identical to an MWW file, that backs up the music while being working on. The program is stable enough that this is in case the OS crashes or some other problem is caused by multi-tasking.

Until late 2015 MusicWorks featured an interesting bug from a combination of OS obsolescence and their proprietary format. Since MusicWorks could only run in the 9x kernel, and .mww was limited to Music Works, music saved as .mww can neither be played, as there are no .mww players, nor converted to .mid, as Music Works only ran in the 9x kernel. The result was thousands of silent, unplayable music files. MusicWorks now runs on all modern Windows versions.

External links
 http://www.tierramedia.com/ is the site of tierramedia, formerly Middle Earth Software Systems. The buy page is still to be made, although it is possible to sign up as a beta tester. Manaccom is still selling MusicWorks as recently as September 2010. Other distributors are not currently selling MusicWorks.

"Manaccom - Australia / New Zealand, Guildsoft - UK / Europe, Trius Inc - United States"

MIDI